Rolador is a municipality of the state of Rio Grande do Sul, Brazil. The population is 2,296 (2020 est.) in an area of 295.01 km². It is located 524 km west of the state capital of Porto Alegre, northeast of Alegrete.

Bounding municipalities

São Pedro do Butiá
Salvador das Missões
Cerro Largo
Mato Queimado
Caibaté
São Luiz Gonzaga
Roque Gonzales

References

External links
http://www.citybrazil.com.br/rs/rolador/ 

Municipalities in Rio Grande do Sul